Romp or ROMP may refer to:

 IBM ROMP, a microprocessor
 Ring opening metathesis polymerization, an olefin polymerization method
 Romps (1885), a series of tales illustrated by Harry Furniss
 The Romp (play) (1767), a comedic afterpiece play derived from Love in the City by Isaac Bickerstaffe
 The Romp (website) (also known as Romp.com), a Los Angeles-based entertainment website
 Bert Romp, an equestrian and Olympic champion from the Netherlands

See also
 "Romp in a Swamp", the 94th animated cartoon short subject in the Woody Woodpecker series
 Streamliner Coaster, a junior roller coaster at Six Flags Fiesta Texas (formerly named "Romp Bomp A Stomp")
 International Bluegrass Music Museum, a bluegrass music museum with an annual summer music festival titled ROMP (originally designating River Of Music Party)